Laovavasa is a village, just south of Veralevuha on the northwest coast of Guadalcanal, Solomon Islands. The population is reportedly entirely Anglican.

References

Populated places in Guadalcanal Province